The following list is a discography of production by Mustard, an American hip hop and R&B music producer from Los Angeles, California. It includes a list of songs produced, co-produced and remixed by year, artist, album and title.  In addition to producing songs for other artists, he has released three solo albums, 10 Summers (2014), Cold Summer (2016), and Perfect Ten (2019), which he produced entirely. He also executive produced projects other than his own such as YG's debut album My Krazy Life and Kid Ink's Summer in the Winter mixtape.

Singles

2010—2011

YG - The Real 4Fingaz 
 "Glowin" (featuring Reem Riches and Ty Dolla Sign)

Dom Kennedy - From the Westside with Love, II 
 03 "When I Come Around"

Lil Twist - The Golden Child 
 "Getting Crazy"

Soulja Boy - Gold On Deck 
 "Don't Sleep (featuring Young Lo)"
 "F.A.N."

Ty Dolla Sign - Hou$e on the Hill 
 "All Star" (featuring Joe Mosees and DJ Mustard)  (produced with Fuego)
 "Go Get It" (featuring Wiz Khalifa) (produced with Terrace Martin)

Ty Dolla Sign -  Backup Drive, Vol. 1 
 "Overtime" (featuring YG and DJ Mustard)

Ty Dolla Sign - Backup Drive, Vol. 2 
 "Naughty" (featuring YG, Mann, Reem Riches and DJ Mustard) (produced with Traknox)

Tyga - #BitchImTheShit 
 "Pop It"
 "In This Thing"

YG - Just Re'd Up 
 "I'm Good"
 "Patty Cake" (featuring DJ Mustard)
 "Pillow Talking" (featuring Short Dawg)
 "Bitches Ain't Shit" (featuring Tyga and Nipsey Hussle)
 "Honestly"
 "I Got Bitches" (featuring Ty Dolla Sign and DJ Mustard)
 "Dippin N Sippin" (featuring Ty Dolla Sign and PC)

2012

2 Chainz - Based on a T.R.U. Story
06. "I'm Different" (produced with Mike Free)

DJ Drama - Quality Street Music
09. "Real Niggas In The Building" (featuring Travis Porter and Kirko Bangz)

Freddie Gibbs - Baby Face Killa
19. "Every City" (featuring YG)

French Montana - Mac and Cheese 3
21. "Thrilla In Manilla" (featuring Tyga)

Joe Moses - From Nothing to Something
15. "Ratchets" (featuring Tyga)
 "Ratchets (Remix)" (featuring The Game and Snoop Dogg)

Kid Ink - Rocketshipshawty
13. "Last Time"

Meek Mill 
00. "I'm Rollin"

Problem - Welcome to Mollyworld
14. "T.O." (featuring Skeme)

Tyga - Careless World: Rise of the Last King
11. "Rack City"
 "Rack City (Remix)" (featuring Wale, Fabolous, Young Jeezy, Meek Mill and T.I.)

Tyga - Well Done 3
01. "No Luck"
10. "Ratchets" (featuring Joe Moses)

YG - 4 Hunnid Degreez
02. "I'ma Thug" (featuring Meek Mill)
04. "Cali Living" (featuring Dom Kennedy and Riko)
05. "Blunted" (featuring Casey Veggies and Shitty)
06. "Gangbang" (featuring TeeCee4800)
08. "Do It With My Tongue"
09. "Keenon Jackson" (featuring TeeCee4800)
10. "Take Everything From Her"
11. "Mess Around" (featuring Charley Hood)
12. "Yo Body"
13. "Go So Deep" (featuring Ty Dolla Sign and PC)
14. "She Don't Love Me" (featuring Ty Dolla Sign)
15. "Respect Her Hustle"
16. "Grindmode" (featuring Nipsey Hussle and 2 Chainz)
21. "God Is My Witness" (featuring Tanea)
22. "Westside 4 Fingaz" (featuring Reem Riches and Riko)

Ty Dolla Sign and Joe Moses - Whoop!
04. "T.O.P" (featuring Dusto (Relly Nation)
05. "Tricks" (featuring Kurupt)
08. "Weekend"
09. "The Man"
16. "Pass Her to the Homie" (featuring Yung)
17. "End Of Discussion" (featuring Reem Riches)

Young Jeezy - It's Tha World
08. "R.I.P." (featuring 2 Chainz)
R.I.P. (Remix) (featuring Kendrick Lamar, YG and Chris Brown)
R.I.P. (G-Mix) (featuring Snoop Dogg, Too $hort and E-40)
13. "All The Same" (featuring E-40)

Teyana Taylor - The Misunderstanding Of Teyana Taylor
06. "Bad Boy" (featuring Honey Cocaine)

TeeFlii - AnnieRUO'TAY 
05. "This Dick"
14. "Celebrate"

Yowda - Fresh Out Da Pot 
01. "Forgot That"
02. "She Knocks"
03. "Shut Up" (featuring YG)

Honey Cocaine - 90's Gold 
 00. "Thug Life Doe"

The Rej3ctz - CR33ZTAPE - RATED R 
 07. "Dance" (featuring YG, Kurupt, Daz of D.P.G)
 08. "Player's Way" (featuring Too $hort)

Red Cafe - American Psycho 
 12. "Game Over"

Iamsu! - The Miseducation Of Iamsu! (Bonus Track) 
 00. "Facetime" (featuring Kool John)

TeeCee4800 - Loyalty Is Everything 
 04. Money

Reem Riches - Road 2 Reem Riches 
 03. "Strange"

G. Perico - Tha Innerprize 
 04. "Bustin" (featuring PC)

Antidote - Let It Blow 
 00. "Let It Blow"

Pink Dollaz - Pink Drugs 
 07. "Stuntin" (featuring Sean Mack)
 10. "Ahhh"
 11. "Bad Bitch"

E-40 - The Block Brochure: Welcome to the Soil 3 
 19. "Over Here" (featuring Too Short and Droop-E) (Bonus Track)

2013

Paul Wall - Checkseason
09. "Gettin Tho'd" (featuring Kid Ink and YG)

Tyga - Hotel California
05. "Hit 'Em Up" (featuring Jadakiss)

TeeFlii and DJ Mustard - Fireworks
 Full album

B.o.B - Underground Luxury
10. "HeadBand" (featuring 2 Chainz) (produced with Mike Free)

DJ Mustard - Ketchup
02. "Intro" (featuring Lil Snupe)
03. "Burn Rubber" (featuring Joe Moses and YG) (produced with DJ Official)
04. "4G's" (featuring TeeCee4800, E-40, Ty Dolla Sign and C. Hood)
05. "Take It To The Neck" (featuring Clyde Carson and YG)
06. "Put This Thang On Ya" (featuring Ty Dolla Sign) (produced with Ty Dolla Sign of D.R.U.G.S)
07. "Bounce That" (featuring Skeme, Casey Veggies, TeeCee4800, RJ and Royce The Choice)
08. "LadyKilla" (featuring Cocc Pistol Cree)
09. "Stupid Dumb" (featuring Bounce and Dorrough)
10. "Been From The Gang" (featuring Kay Ess, YG, Nipsey Hussle and RJ)
12. "Straight Ryder" (featuring Candice)
13. "Nothin Like Me" (featuring Dom Kennedy)
14. "Fuck That Nigga" (featuring Ty Dolla Sign, TeeFLii, Tory Lanez and Constantine)
16. "See Me Gettin’ Money" (featuring YG, Cash Out and K. Smith)
17. "Paranoid" (featuring Ty Dolla Sign and Joe Moses)
18. "CNN" (featuring Kid Ink)
19. "Don’t Trust Nobody" (featuring Killa Kam and RJ)
21. "Midnight Run" (featuring Royce The Choice, Skeme and Casey Veggies)

Dom Kennedy - Get Home Safely
18. "Nothin Like Me" (featuring DJ Mustard)

The Game - OKE: Operation Kill Everything
11. "Same Hoes" (featuring Nipsey Hussle and Ty Dolla Sign)

Kirko Bangz - Progression III
12. "Shirt By Versace" (featuring YG, French Montana, G Haze)

Ty Dolla Sign - Beach House 2
03. "Paranoid" (featuring B.o.B)
12. "Dolla Sign" (featuring YG)

YG - Boss Yo Life Up Gang
04. "Shame On You" (featuring Nipsey Hussle and Payroll)
05. "Next Bitch" (featuring Doughboyz Cashout and Young Jeezy)
14. "Fuck You" (featuring Young Jeezy)

YG - Just Re'd Up 2
02. "Im 4rm Bompton"
04. "Im A Real 1"
05. "This Yick" (featuring Dom Kennedy and Joe Moses)
06. "Make It Clap"
08. "Million" (producer with Mike Lee)
09. "Sprung" (featuring TeeFLii)
10. "I Wanna B Down" (producer with Nic Nack)
15. "You Broke" (featuring Nipsey Hussle)
16. "Gotta Get Dough" (featuring TeeCee4800)
18. "Fuck It" (featuring Reem Riches)
19. "B I T C H" (featuring D-Lo) (producer with Mike Lee)
20. "Dont Trust" (featuring Young Scooter)
21. "I Smoke I Drank" (featuring Beautiful April)
22. "I Like" (featuring Juicy J)
23. "I'll Do Ya" (featuring Ty Dolla Sign)

R. Kelly - Black Panties
11. Spend That (featuring Young Jeezy) (producer with Mike Free and R. Kelly)

Tyga - Well Done 4
02. "Bang Out (featuring Eazy-E)"
14. "Throw It Up (with DJ Mustard)"

Bow Wow - GreenLight 5 
 02. "Caked Up"
 04. "We In Da Club"

RJ - O.M.M.I.O 
 03. "Ride Wit Me (produced with DJ Swish)"
 04. "Shoulda Coulda" (featuring KayEss)
 06. "Get It" (Feat TeeFlii)
 23. "Dick N' Instructions"

Travis Porter - Mr Porter 
 02. "Goin Deep" (featuring Tyga)
 12. "Nine Times Outta Ten" (featuring YG)
 17. "Need One's"

TeeFlii - AnnieRUO'TAY 2 
 04. "Sprung" (featuring YG)
 06. "Pussy"
 15. "A Thug (featuring Fattboxx)"

TeeCee4800 and Nano and Reem Riches - Mid-Town Money 
 02. "Nigga Get Off" (featuring RJ)
 03. "Callin"
 05. "Pop A Molly"
 11. "Highlights"
 13. "Let Me Hit It"
 18. "4G'z" (featuring E-40, Ty Dolla Sign and Charley Hood)

Dorrough Music - Shut The City Down 
 11. "After Party"

Joe Moses - From Nothing To Something Vol. 2 
 04. "Get Nekkid"
 08. "Nothing To Something"
 17. "Ratchets (Remix)" (featuring Tyga)

DJ Mustard - Money 
 00. Money (featuring TeeCee4800)

will.I.am - #willpower 
13. Feeling Myself (featuring Miley Cyrus, French Montana and Wiz Khalifa)

SNL - Homies 
 00. "Homies"

Legacy - Dolo 
 04. "Someone Young"

Young Jeezy - The Homie 
 00. "The Homie" (featuring YG)

Young Lace - Bipolar 
 13. "Straight Gas" (featuring 504Yung and Privilege)

Reem Riches - Road To Reem Riches 2 
 02. Money On My Mind (produced with Wizzo GMB)
 17. Go Up (featuring Jay 305)

Charley Hood - G.P.G.O: Got Pimpin Goin On 
 15. Shawty (featuring DJ Mustard)

KayEss - Mollywater 
 12. "Been From The Gang" (featuring YG, Nipsey Hussle and RJ)

Ludacris - #IDGAF 
 04. "Helluva Night"

Tae Snap - Blue Flame 
 05. "Fa Da Dough" (featuring Problem)

S.L.A.M Squad - T.I.U. (Turn It Up) 
 00. "T.I.U. (Turn It Up)"

Young Dro - High Times 
 03. "Strong"

DxFresh - Ciroc Shots 
 00. "Ciroc Shots" (featuring Rapper Kooh)

Chasen Dreams - The Takeover 
07. "Turn Up"

Flo Rida 
00. Rear View (featuring August Alsina)

2014

Kid Ink - My Own Lane
03. "Show Me" (featuring Chris Brown)
06. "Main Chick" (featuring Chris Brown)
09. "Rollin'"

Ty Dolla Sign - Beach House EP
02. "Paranoid" (featuring B.o.B)
03. "Paranoid (Remix)" (featuring Trey Songz, French Montana and DJ Mustard)
04. "Or Nah" (featuring Wiz Khalifa and DJ Mustard) (produced with Mickley Adam)

Alley Boy - Alley Shakur: The Soul Of A Runaway Slave (Mixtape)
15. "Celebration" (featuring Yung Berg and Joe Moses)

Rick Ross - Mastermind
14. "Sanctified" (featuring Big Sean and Kanye West) (Additional vocals from Betty Wright) (produced with Kanye West, Mike Dean)

Plies - Da Last Real Nigga Left
16. "Baking Soda" (featuring Tyga)

YG - My Krazy Life
02. "BPT"
03. "I Just Wana Party (featuring Schoolboy Q and Jay Rock)
04. "Left, Right"
05. "Bicken Back Being Bool"
07. "My Nigga" (featuring Rich Homie Quan and Young Jeezy)
08. "Do It To Ya" (featuring TeeFLii) (produced with C-Ballin)
10. "Who Do You Love" (featuring Drake)
14. "Sorry Momma" (featuring Ty Dolla Sign) (produced with Terrace Martin)
15. "When I Was Gone" (featuring RJ, Tee Cee, Charlie Hood, Reem Riches and Slim 400)
16. "Bompton"
17. "My Nigga" (Remix) (featuring  (featuring Lil Wayne, Nicki Minaj, Meek Mill and Rich Homie Quan)
18. "459" (featuring Natasha Mosley)

Jason Derulo - Talk Dirty
06. "Kama Sutra" (featuring Kid Ink)

August Alsina - Testimony
15. "Numb" (featuring B.o.B and Yo Gotti)

Jennifer Lopez - A.K.A.
16. "Girls" (featuring Tyga)

Trey Songz - Trigga
03. "Na Na"

RJ - Takin Niggas Beats
10. "How U Feel"

Gucci Mane and Young Thug - The Purple Album
07. "Riding Around" (featuring Young La and Dk)
10. "Umm Hmm" (featuring MPA Wicced)

Sir Michael Rocks - Banco
14. "Ain't Nothing Like"  (featuring Chuck Inglish and Too Short)

DJ Mustard - 10 Summers
01. "Low Low" (featuring Nipsey Hussle, TeeCee and RJ)
02. "Ghetto Tales" (featuring Jay 305 and TeeCee)
03. "Throw Your Hood Up" (featuring Dom Kennedy, Royce and RJ)
04. "No Reason" (featuring YG, Jeezy, Nipsey Hussle, and RJ)
05. "Giuseppee" (featuring 2 Chainz and Jeezy and Yo Gotti)
06. "Face Down" (featuring Lil Wayne, Big Sean, YG and Boosie Badazz)
07. "Down On Me" (featuring 2Chainz and Ty Dolla Sign)
08. "Can't Tell Me Shit" (featuring IamSu! and AKAFrank)
09. Tinashe Checks In (Interlude)
10. "4 Digits" (featuring Fabolous and Eric Bellinger)
11. Ty Dolla Sign Checks In (Interlude)
12. "Deep" (featuring Rick Ross, Wiz Khalifa, TeeFlii)

Wiz Khalifa - Blacc Hollywood
15. "You and Your Friends" (featuring Snoop Dogg and Ty Dolla Sign)

Ty Dolla Sign - Sign Language
09. "Type Of Shit I Hate" (featuring Fabolous and YG)

Young Thug - 1017 Thug 3: The Finale
08. "L.A Swag"

Young Scrap - Faded Ambition
11. "Love LA" (featuring DJ Mustard)
13. "Bust It Open" (featuring DJ Mustard)

Jeezy - Seen It All : The Autobiography (Bonus Track)
00. "Link Up" (featuring Beenie Man and Ty Dolla Sign)

Que - Can You Digg It?
07. "Rich Nigga Problems" (featuring 2 Chainz)

Tinashe - Aquarius
05. "2 On" (featuring Schoolboy Q) (produced with Redwine and DJ Marley Waters)

T.I. - Paperwork
07. "No Mediocre" (featuring Iggy Azalea)

Vell - Stay Down To Come Up (mixtape)
02. "Oakland" (featuring DJ Mustard)
03.  "Can You Feel It ?" (featuring Samm)
07. "Run"
10. "Childish" (featuring Ty Dolla Sign; produced with Larry Jayy)
13. "D.O.A."
17. "Right Here"

Keyshia Cole - Point of No Return
09. "She"

Mila J - M.I.L.A.
01. "My Main" (featuring Ty Dolla Sign)

Tinashe - Fuckin With Me 
00. "Fuckin With Me"

Omarion - Sex Playlist
02. "Post To Be" (featuring Chris Brown and Jhene Aiko)

YG - Blame It On the Streets
04. "Ride With Me" (featuring RJ and Nipsey Hussle)
09. "2015 Flow"

Nipsey Hussle - Mailbox Money
07. "Where Yo Money At?" (featuring Pacman)

Aka Frank - Legend EP 
 02. "Real One" (featuring London)
 04. "Can't Tell Me Shit" (featuring Iamsu!)

Riff Raff - Neon Icon 
 12. "How To Be The Man"

DJ Mustard - Vato 
 00. "Vato" (featuring Que, YG and Jeezy)

Mikey oOo and JoJoe 
 00. "On My Clock" (featuring TeeFlii and DJ Mustard)

Slim 400 - Keepin It 400 
 06. "Where The Party At?" (featuring TeeFlii)

Kiki Rowe - Kiki Rowe 
 02. "Trust Issues"

Yowda - Free El Chapo 
 10. "Bitch I Got It" (featuring Shorty T, Sav L)
 13. "Forgot That" (featuring Tracy T)

Young Offishall 
 00. "Turnt"

Eric Statz 
 00. "Been Hit"

Eric Statz 
 00. "Swoop" (featuring DJ Mustard)

Young Lawless - NAR F-TS 
 05. "Summer Time" (featuring Ty Dolla Sign and Kam Parker)

Ray Casino 
 00. "Thuggin"

Meek Mill - She Don't Know 
00. "She Don't Know" (featuring Ty Dolla Sign)

The HoodStarz - 56 Months 
 11. "Handle That" (featuring Clyde Carson and Show Banga)

Alexa Goddard - Marilyn 
 02. "Pretty Girls" (featuring DJ Mustard)

Rich City Lil Tae - Polo 
 00. "Polo" (featuring Lil Cyko)

David Cash - Escape: The Revenge of the Slappers 
 03. "Chevy (Remix)" (featuring E-40, Problem and Clyde Carson)
 04. "Bumper"

iShowOff 
 00. "Ain't Built For This" (featuring Sean Kingston)

Jamie Foxx - Party Ain't A Party 
 00. "Party Ain't a Party" (featuring 2 Chainz)

Tory Lanez - Conflicts Of My Soul: The 416 Story 
 11. "Know What's Up / The Take (featuring Kirko Bangz)" (produced with Tory Lanez and Xaphoon Jones)

Rihanna  
 00. "FourFiveSeconds" (DJ Mustard Remix)

Justine Skye - Collide 
 00. "Collide" (featuring Tyga)

Compton World - The Function 
 01. "Everyday"
 02. "7-11"
 03. "Domino"
 04. "Goin Up"
 05. "My Niggaz"
 07. "Where The Party At" (featuring Stacey Lee)
 08. "Tonite" (featuring Stacey Lee)
 09. "Sum 'Mo Wit It" (featuring Slim 400)
 10. "Swerve"

Bobby Brackins 
 00. "Hot Box" (DJ Mustard Remix)

N$ - Wassup 
 00. "Wussap" (featuring Crooked I and DJ Mustard) (produced with Kenny Stevens)

Travis Porter - I Need Ones 
 00. "I Need Ones (Remix) (with Ben J)

Earl Swavey - Yurple Rain 
 03. "Yurple Rain" (featuring DJWorm2G)
 09. "Give It To You" (featuring Extindo Gang)

KSnS - Drop It 
 00. "Drop It"

Bluejay - My Team 
 00. "My Team" (featuring DJ Mustard)

Famous Uno - Switch 
 00. "Switch" (featuring DJ Mustard)

D. Hawk - Don't Wanna Be A Player No More 
 00. "Don't Wanna Be A Player No More"

Swish - All The Way 
 00. "All The Way"

Ko$$ - For Dem Bandz 
 00. "For Dem Bandz"

Clyde Carson - Playboy 
 03. "Bring 'Em Out"
 06. "Back It Up" (featuring August Alsina)

Lashawn's Away - Trilluminati 
 04. "Better Know" (featuring TeeFlii)

Extindo Gang - Up In Smoke Vol. 1 
 03. "Get On" (featuring Too $hort and Hitta J3)

Shabere - Can't Tell 
00. "Can't Tell"

Elway - Come Get This Work 2 
 08. "Love These Hoes" (featuring Banc Cali and Av LMKR)

Cocc Pistol Cree - Postpar2m 
 05. "Lady Killa"

Alja Kamilton - Tip Of Yo Tongue 
 00. "Tip Of Yo Tongue"

Done Deal - Western Hospitality XVI 
 12. "Realest" (featuring Av LMKR and AD Da Loc)

Jay Lyriq - Money 
 00. "Money" (featuring Joe Young and Shorty Mack)

Master P - What The Business Is 
 00. "What The Business Is" (featuring Clyde Carson and Eastwood)

Usher - Or Nah 
 00. "Or Nah"

Christian 
00. "What it is"

2015

Gucci Mane - Mr Clean, The Middle Man
10. "Vampire"

Kid Ink - Full Speed
07. "Be Real" (featuring Dej Loaf; produced with J Gramm and Twice as Nice)
10. "About Mine" (featuring Trey Songz; produced with Twice as Nice)

TeeFLii - Starr
12. "24 Hours" (featuring 2 Chainz)

Big Sean - Dark Sky Paradise
04. "I Don't Fuck with You" (featuring E-40; produced with Kanye West)
09. "I Know" (featuring Jhene Aiko)
10. "Deep" (featuring Lil Wayne)

Tyga and Chris Brown - Fan of a Fan: The Album
02. "Nothin Like Me" (featuring Ty Dolla Sign)
16. "Banjo"

Dok2 - Multillionaire
04. "Multillionaire"

Ty Dolla Sign - Free TC 
03. "Saved" (featuring E-40)
13. "Only Right" (featuring TeeCee4800, YG and Joe Moses)

Jamie Foxx - Hollywood : A Story Of A Dozen Roses 
 17. "Pretty Thing"

Jessie J - Sorry To Interrupt
00. "Sorry to Interrupt"  (featuring Jhene Aiko and Rixton)

Krept and Konan - The Long Way Home
11. "Freak of the Week" (featuring Jeremih)

RJ - O.M.M.I.O 2 
 04. "Dance With Me" (featuring Dom Kennedy)
 06. "Hoes Come Easy"
 07. "Comfortable"
 08. "Watch What You Say"
 16. "Just Might Let Her"
 17. "Difference"
 19. "Gudda" (featuring Plies and Jay 305)

RJ and Choice - Rich Off Mackin 
 01. "Intro"
 03. "Playin Tricks" (produced with DJ Swish)
 04. "Favor For Flavor" (featuring Splacc)
 05. "Fuck Wit Yall" (featuring Leswood)
 06. "Do It" (featuring Terrace Martin)
 11. "I Just Came To Play" (featuring Shaun Sloan)
 13. "Just Might" (featuring Que)
 15. "Value"

DJ Mustard - 10 Summers : The Mixtape Vol.1 
 01. "Intro" (featuring RJ, Big Mike and Choice)
 02. "Body Count" (featuring RJ and Skeme, Co-Prod with Larry Jayy)
 04. "Shooters" (featuring The Game, RJ, Skeme and Joe Moses, Co-Prod with Larry Jayy)
 05. "Tool" (featuring TeeCee4800 and Jay 305)
 06. "Trippin Off Hoes" (featuring RJ and Choice)
 07. "You Know It" (featuring Nef The Pharaoh, Splacc and Big Mike)
 08. "I Be Wit" (featuring Choice)
 09. "All About You" (featuring TeeFlii, Choice and Casey Veggies)
 11. "Broke Boy" (featuring IamSu!, Choice and RJ)
 12. "Overdose" (featuring TeeFlii, IamSu! and Choice)
 14. "Mr Big Bank Budda" (featuring DrakeO)
 15. "Ice Cream" (featuring Dom Kennedy and Ty Dolla Sign)
 16. "Love" (featuring Justine Skye)
 17. "Down Love" (featuring TeeFlii)

IamSu! - Eyes On Me 
 02. "Nothin Less"

King Los - God Money War
08. "Can't Fade Us" (featuring Ty Dolla Sign)

Eric Bellinger - Cuffing Season 
 02. "You Can Have The Hoes" (featuring Boosie Badazz)

Nelly 
 00. "The Fix" (featuring Jeremih)

TeeCee4800 - Realness Over Millions 
 01. "Gettin 2 It" (featuring Ty Dolla Sign and RJ)
 08. "Tool" (featuring Jay 305)
 09. "7 In The Mornin"
 14. "25 To Life"

Hurricane Chris - Hurricane Season 
 03. "Sections" (featuring Ty Dolla Sign)
 16. "Breakin Her Back"

The Game - The Documentary 2 
 2–14. "My Flag / Da Homies" (featuring Ty Dolla Sign, Jay 305, AD, Mitchy Slick, Joe Moses, RJ and Skeme)

Joe Moses - Brackin 
 10. "Is You Down" (featuring Kevin McCall)

Gunplay - Living Legend 
 06. "Wuzhanindoe" (featuring YG)

Young Sam - Trapfornia 2 
 08. "We Know It" (featuring Joe Moses)

Vell 
 00. "Ain't Yo Brother"

Ester Dean - Miss Ester Dean 
 06. "New Shit"

DrakeO The Ruler - I Am Mr Mosely 
 02. "Gone In 60 Seconds"
 06. "Mr Big Bank Budda"

Kid Demigod 
 00. "California Street Dream"

MustardMayo - Got U 
 00. Got U (featuring Marc E.Bassy, Iamsu! and Symba)

T-Pain 
 00. "Make That Shit Work" (featuring Juicy J)

iLoveMakonnen - I Love Makonnen 2 
 03. "Second Chance"

K Kutta - NASCAR Money 
 03. "Nascar Money" (featuring Flo Rida)

Choice - By Choice Not Force 
 01. "I Be Wit"
 02. "Move Around" (featuring RJ)
 03. "Everything New"
 04. "SportCenter"
 07. "Catch Me If You Can" (featuring DrakeO The Ruler)

Yellow Claw - Blood For Mercy 
 05. "In My Room" (featuring DJ Mustard, Ty Dolla Sign and Tyga)

Kid Ink - Lie To Kick It 
 00. "Lie To Kick It" (featuring Ty Dolla Sign and Bricc Baby)

DJ Mustard - NBA 2K16 Soundtrack 
 00. "Ball At Night" (Instrumental)
 00. "You Don't Want It" (featuring RJ)

Jeremih - Late Nights
12. "Don't Tell 'Em" (featuring YG)
00. "Peace Sign" (featuring Fabolous and Red Cafe) (Leftover)

Rick Ross - Black Market
11. "Peace Sign" (additional vocals by Red Cafe and Jeremih)

Trey Songz - To Whom It May Concern 
 08. "Stuck"

Tayf3rd 
 00. "Too Fast For You" (produced with Groovy Jose)

Joelle James 
 00. "Rookie Of The Year"

Fat Trel - SDMG 
 16. "That's Life" (featuring YG)

The Game - Freakshow 
 00. "Freakshow" (featuring Ed Sheeran)

M.I.C - A.W.A.P (All Work All Play) 
 03. "G Thang" (featuring Rayven Justice) (produced with The DreemTeam)

Joe Moses - From Nothing 2 Something 3 
 03. "Mr Get Dough"
 07. "Lit" (featuring Ty Dolla Sign)

DJ Mustard - Mr Get Dough 
 00. "Mr Get Dough" (featuring DrakeO The Ruler, RJ, Choice)

Young Scooter - Jug Season 
 07. "All With Me" (featuring Casino)

Kid Ink - Summer In The Winter 
 01. "Bunny Ranch"
 02. "Real Recognize"
 03. "Promise" (featuring Fetty Wap)
 04. "Rewind" (featuring Akon)
 06. "Same Day"
 08. "Summer In The Winter" (featuring Omarion)
 10. "That's On You"
 11. "Time Out"

Jay 305 - Inner City Hero 
 13. "Thuggin'" (featuring Joe Moses)

Salty - Bando 
 00. "Bando" (featuring Iamsu! and G Val)

Jordin Sparks - Right Here Right Now 
 14. "It Ain't You"

iShowOff 
 00. "I Remember It All"

SmokeOne - #FreeSmokeOne 
 03. "Let That Bitch Go" (featuring RJ)

Ty Dolla Sign - Airplane Mode 
 03. "Rich Ni$$a" (featuring YG) (produced with Twice As Nice)
 09. "Money Ruin Friendships" (featuring Joe Moses)

Fresco - Popular 
 00. "Popular" (featuring DJ Mustard)
 00. "Popular" (Remix) (featuring RJ and DJ Mustard)

Ty Dolla Sign 
 00. "Stand For" (DJ Mustard Remix) (produced with DJ Freedo, Ricky Mears and DJ Iknoso)

Migos 
 00. "Look At My Dab" (DJ Mustard and 4B Remix)

DJ Mustard - Why'd You Call 
 00. "Why'd You Call" (featuring Ty Dolla Sign and iLoveMakonnen)

Cashmere Cat and DJ Mustard - Ice Rink 
 00. "Ice Rink"

Zhu, DJ Snake and DJ Mustard - Faded 2.0 
 00. "Faded 2.0"

Beyoncé 
 00. "7/11" (DJ Mustard Remix) (produced with DJ Freedo, Ricky Mears and DJ Iknoso)

Cam and China - Nada 
 00. "Nada"

Mistah FAB - S.T.F.K. 2 
 07. "None Of Y'all"

N.O.R.E. - We Don't 
 00. "We Don't (featuring Rick Ross, Ty Dolla Sign and City Boy Dee)

Posse - Ride Or Die 
 00. "Ride Or Die" (featuring Lil Yase and Yatta)

Infinity - Bright Lights 
 00. "Bright Lights" (featuring DJ Beamon)

Rayven Justice - The Cassette Playlist 
 04. Tucked Off

Commence - In This 
 00. "In This"

Kid Demigod - California Street Dream 
 00. "California Street Dream" (produced with Jose Frenchie)

Gmomo - Spazzing Out Vol. 1: Lost Identity 
 04. "Stay Gettin Tatted" (featuring Young Sam and DJ Mustard)

Galantis 
 00. "Runaway" (DJ Mustard Remix)

Mr Capone-E 
 00. "Loco" (featuring Migos and Mally Mall)

JR Castro 
 00. "Get Home" (featuring Kid Ink and Migos)

Ben Harris - Dat Ass Doe 
 00. "Dat Ass Doe"

Jim Jones - Gang 
 00. "Gang" (featuring T-Rav and Neek Bucks)

Da Illest - Fire 
 00. "Fire" (featuring Mila J)

Indian Blue - Million Dollar Dreams 
 05. "No Reason" (featuring Slim 400)
 07. "Fucc Yo Bitch" (featuring YG and Juvenile)

2016

DJ Mustard - Whole Lotta Lovin' 
 00. "Whole Lotta Lovin'" (featuring Travis Scott)

Tinashe 
 00. "Secret"

Ella Mai - Time EP 
 Full album

Ella Mai - No Rush 
 00. "No Rush"

Ty Dolla Sign - Free TC (Deluxe) 
 18. "Wavy (featuring Joe Moses)"
 20. "Westside"

Kid Ink 
 00. "Rounds" (featuring Fabolous and Jeremih)

Rihanna - Anti 
 07. "Needed Me"

Bonnie McKee 
 00. "Tough Enough"

Ty Dolla Sign - Bang My Line 
 00. "Bang My Line"

Trinidad James 
 00. "Just A Lil' Thick (She Juicy)" (featuring Mystikal and Lil Dicky)

Tinashe 
 00. "They're On"

Sean Paul 
 00. "Tell Dem Again"

A$AP Ferg - Always Strive And Prosper 
 03. "Strive" (featuring Missy Elliott) (produced with Stelios Phili)

Eric Statz 
 00. "Hide Girl" (featuring DJ Mustard)
 00. "Hide Girl 2" (featuring DJ Mustard)
 00. "Hide Girl 3" (featuring DJ Mustard)

Travis Scott 
 00. "Party Till"

Luce Cannon - Watch Me 
 00. "Watch Me"

Teyana Taylor 
 00. "Freak On" (featuring Chris Brown)

Wale - Summer On Sunset 
 04. "Thought It" (featuring Ty Dolla Sign and Joe Moses)

Joe Moses - Live 4rom the 5ive 
 10. "To A Boss" (featuring Ty Dolla Sign)

DJ Esco - Project E.T (Esco Terrestrial) 
 01. "Projet E.T Intro" 
 11. "Stupidly Crazy" (featuring Casey Veggies and Nef The Pharaoh)

G-Eazy 
 00. "In The Meantime" (featuring Quavo)

Rae Sremmund - SremmLife 2 
 07. "Set The Roof" (featuring Lil Jon) (produced with Mike Will Made It and HighDefRazjah)

Britney Spears - Glory (2020 reissue bonus track) 
 13. "Mood Ring"

Ty Dolla Sign - Campaign 
 13. "Pu$$y" (featuring Trey Songz and Wiz Khalifa) (produced with Allen Ritter)

DJ Mustard - Cold Summer 
 1. "Been a Long Time" (featuring  YG and Ty Dolla Sign) (produced with Twice as Nice)
 2. "Ridin' Around" (featuring Nipsey Hussle and RJ) 
 3. "Want Her" (featuring Quavo and YG) 
 4. "Dope Boy" (featuring O.T. Genasis and Jeezy) (produced with Larry Jayy)
 5. "Know My Name" (featuring Rich The Kid and RJ) 
 6. "Lil Baby" (featuring Ty Dolla Sign) (produced with Rance)
 7. "Shake That Ass" (featuring TeeCee4800 and K Camp) (produced with Christopher Sanders)
 8. "Don't Hurt Me" (featuring Nicki Minaj and Jeremih) (produced with Twice as Nice)
 9. "Party" (featuring Young Thug and YG) 
 10. "Main Bitch" (featuring RJ) 
 11. "What These Bitches Want" (featuring Meek Mill, Nipsey Hussle and Ty Dolla Sign) (produced with Terrace Martin)
 12. "10,000 Hours" (featuring Ella Mai) (produced with J-Holt)
 13. "Another Summer" (featuring Rick Ross, John Legend and James Fauntleroy) (produced with Rance, Cardiak and Focus)

Post Malone - Stoney 
 02. "Big Lie" (produced with Twice as Nice)

Chris Brown - Attack The Block 
02. "Everybody" (featuring Young Lo)

2017

A Boogie wit da Hoodie - The Bigger Artist 
09. "Somebody" (featuring Don Q)

Big Sean - I Decided. 
08. "Owe Me" (produced with Travis Scott and Amaire Johnson)

Meek Mill - Wins & Losses 
 04. "Whatever You Need" (featuring Chris Brown and Ty Dolla Sign) (produced with James Royo and Rance)

Demi Lovato - Tell Me You Love Me 
08. "Lonely" (featuring Lil Wayne)

Ella Mai - Ready EP 
Full Album

21 Savage - Issa Album 
07. "FaceTime" (produced with Twice as Nice)

Bebe Rexha 
00. "Naughty"

RJ - Mr. LA 
02. Blammer (co-produced with Authentic)
03. Brackin (co-produced with Authentic and Larry J)
05. Thank God  (feat. Blac Youngsta)
08. 2 Grown
09. Is It Mine (feat. Ty Dolla $ign)
13. Nobody (co-produced with FeezyDisABangah)

DJ Mustard & RJ - The Ghetto 
Full Album

2018

Comethazine - BAWK$EE
15. Sticks Out The Window

SOB x RBE - GANGIN 
05. Can't

Lil Dicky 
00. "Freaky Friday" (featuring Chris Brown) (additional vocals from Ed Sheeran DJ Khaled and Kendall Jenner) (Co-produced with Cashmere Cat)

YG - Stay Dangerous 
01. - "10 Times"
04. - "Suu Whoop" (co-produced with Jordan Holt)
05. - "Cant Get In Kanada" (co-produced with Official)
06. - "Too Cocky"
07. - "Big Bank"
08. - "Power" (co-produced with Citoonthebeat)
09. - "Slay"
11. - "Too Brazy" (co-produced with Citoonthebeat)
14. - "Free The Homies Interlude"
15. - "Bomptown Finest"

Belly 
00. - "4 Days" (Featuring YG)

Cardi B - Invasion of Privacy 
11. - "She Bad" (Featuring YG) (co-produced with DJ Official)

Ashanti 
00. - "Say Less" (featuring Ty Dolla Sign)

T-Pain - Everything Must Go (Vol. 1) 

06. - "Do It"

Mariah Carey - Caution

02. - "With You"

Lil Wayne - Tha Carter V
16. - "Open Safe"

2019

DJ Mustard & Migos 
02. - "Pure Water"

03 Greedo - Still Summer In the Projects
Full album

YG - 4Real 4Real
02. "Bottle Service" 
03. "In the Dark"
04. "Go Loko"
06. "I Was on the Block"

DJ Mustard - Perfect Ten 

 Full album

Young Thug - So Much Fun 
18. "Boy Back"

2020

Nav - Good Intentions
15. "Did You Wrong"

Pop Smoke - Shoot for the Stars, Aim for the Moon
11. "West Coast"

Ty Dolla $ign - Featuring Ty Dolla $ign
15. "By Yourself"

Megan Thee Stallion - Good News
11. "Intercourse"

2021

Roddy Ricch
1. "Late at Night"

Notes

References

External links
 
 
 
 

Production discographies
 
 
Hip hop discographies
Discographies of American artists